Caribbean Shores is an electoral constituency in the Belize District represented in the House of Representatives of the National Assembly of Belize since 2015 by Kareem Musa of the People's United Party.

Profile

The Caribbean Shores constituency was one of 10 new seats created for the 1984 general election. Caribbean Shores occupies the north end of the peninsula Belize City sits on, bordered by the Freetown and Fort George constituencies to the south. The constituency has an extensive shoreline on the Caribbean Sea, hence its name.

Former Prime Minister Manuel Esquivel represented Caribbean Shores from 1984 to 1998.

Area Representatives

Elections

References

Political divisions in Belize
Caribbean Shores
Belizean House constituencies established in 1984